Ooreh (also Romanized as Ūreh; also known as Ūreh-ye Pā’īn) is a village in Karkas Rural District, in the Central District of Natanz County, Isfahan Province, Iran. At the 2006 census, its population was 251, in 103 families.

References 

Populated places in Natanz County